Karm Island is an island off the coast of Antarctica. Mapped by Norwegian cartographers from aerial photos taken by the Lars Christensen Expedition, 1936–37, and called Karm (coaming). The group was first visited by an ANARE (Australian National Antarctic Research Expeditions) party in 1954.

References

See also 
 List of Antarctic and sub-Antarctic islands

Islands of Kemp Land